Pseudomus is a genus of hidden snout weevils in the beetle family Curculionidae. There are more than 20 described species in Pseudomus.

Species
These 26 species belong to the genus Pseudomus:

 Pseudomus albosparsus Chevrolat, 1880
 Pseudomus apiatus Boheman, 1844
 Pseudomus bimaculatus Suffrian, 1872
 Pseudomus bohemani Kuschel, 1955
 Pseudomus cacuminatus Boheman, 1844
 Pseudomus deltoides Buchanan, 1947
 Pseudomus fairmairei Chevrolat, 1880
 Pseudomus fistulosus Kuschel, 1955
 Pseudomus inflatus LeConte, 1885
 Pseudomus maximus Suffrian, 1872
 Pseudomus mexicanus Chevrolat, 1880
 Pseudomus militaris Schoenherr, 1837
 Pseudomus nitidicutis Chevrolat, 1880
 Pseudomus notatus Boheman, 1837
 Pseudomus parallelus Hustache, 1930
 Pseudomus proximus Chevrolat, 1880
 Pseudomus punctatissimus Chevrolat, 1880
 Pseudomus rugifer Suffrian, 1872
 Pseudomus sedentarius (Say, 1831)
 Pseudomus semicribratus Boheman, 1844
 Pseudomus singularis Chevrolat, 1880
 Pseudomus trisignatus Kuschel, 1955
 Pseudomus trochilus Prena & Whitehead, 2012
 Pseudomus truncatus LeConte, 1876
 Pseudomus turgidus Klug, 1850
 Pseudomus viduus Boheman, 1837

References

Further reading

 
 
 

Cryptorhynchinae
Articles created by Qbugbot